Sllatinë or Slatina (Serbian Cyrillic) is a village in Kosovo located in the municipality of Vushtrri and in the district of Mitrovicë. According to the Kosovo census of 2011, it has 491 inhabitants, all of whom are Albanians.

History 
The village is mentioned for the first time in the Ottoman defter of district of Branković 1455, with 18 houses, including the house of the priest Bogdan.

Demographics

Notes

References

See also 
 List of populated places in Kosovo

External links

Villages in Vushtrri